Highway 57 is an east–west highway through central Israel and the West Bank. In the past, it was an uninterrupted road from Netanya, a city on the Mediterranean coast in the west, to Damia Bridge across the Jordan River in the east. The road existed in its full length from the time of the British Mandate, and parts of it are even older. Today the road is separated into three unconnected parts: the first from Netanya to Nitzanei Oz interchange at Highway 6, the second from there to an Israel Defense Forces checkpoint in Beka'ot in the northeastern West Bank, and the third from there until Damia Bridge. The middle portion of the road between Nitzanei Oz and Beka'ot passes through Tulkarm and Nablus, and most of it is located in Area A and Area B controlled by the Palestinian Authority. Various restrictions on traffic exist in these areas.

Junctions and Interchanges on the highway

The western portion of Route 57 is located entirely within Israel proper, and crosses the narrow strip of land between the Mediterranean coast and the Green Line. It is 15 km long from Netanya to Tulkarm. The ceasefire line between Israel and Jordan was located at Tulkarm between 1948 and 1967, when Israel captured the West Bank in the Six-Day War. Today it is not possible to continue from Israel proper into Tulkarm because the Israeli West Bank barrier blocks the road, but it is possible to enter the Nitzanei Shalom industrial zone from the western (Israeli) side. This portion of the road is a divided highway with two lanes on each side.

Central portion of the route
The second portion of the route, from Tulkarm via Nablus to Beka'ot junction, is a continuous road with one carriageway. In the first part from Tulkarm until Einav junction it is open only to Palestinian traffic, and it connects Tulkarm and surrounding villages to Nur a-Shams and Anabta, and from there to Nablus. This road roughly follows the path of Nahal Shekhem (Nahal means creek).

Apparently the road previously passed through the center of the city of Tulkarm, but today it passes through the northern part of the city. This portion of the route served as part of the primary route connecting northern and central Israel before the construction of Highway 4. This old route went from Haifa south via Jenin, Tulkarm and Qalqilya to Tel Aviv.

For this part of the present-day route there is a bypass road designated for Israeli traffic that was constructed after the Oslo Accords, Route 557. It bypasses the region from the south, and passes next to the communities of Qalansawe, Tayibe, Avnei Hefetz, Shufa, Einav and Beit Lid, and reunites with Highway 57 at Einav junction, next to an IDF checkpoint, located on the Palestinian part of the route. From Einav junction to Shavei Shomron junction, the road is jointly accessible to Israelis and Palestinians. From Shavei Shomron to Nablus the traffic is again exclusively Palestinian. The road passes through Dir Sharf, Beit Iba checkpoint and the center of the city of Nablus, based on the path of Nahal Shekhem. From Nablus the road is a single carriageway, based on the path of Nahal Tirtza (Wadi al-Far'ah), descending from Nablus into the Jordan Rift Valley. In this portion until the IDF checkpoint at the moshav Beka'ot the traffic is exclusively limited to Palestinians.

Eastern portion of the route
From Beka'ot checkpoint, which stands at the junction of the northern section of the Allon Road (Route 578), the road continues along the path of Nahal Tirtza in a southeast direction. The road follows the ancient "Sunset Road" (דרך מבוא השמש) between the Way of the Patriarchs and the King's Highway. This area is under Israeli control and the road is jointly open to Israeli and Palestinian traffic. For a 2-km stretch the road overlaps with the Allon Road, then separates from it at Hamra junction, where the central Allon Road (Route 508) begins. Highway 57 continues until the Damia Bridge over the Jordan River, which functions as a border crossing for commerce between Israel and Jordan.

See also
 List of highways in Israel

References

57